Lasiorhinus is the genus containing the two extant hairy-nosed wombats, which are found in Australia. The southern hairy-nosed wombat is found in some of the semiarid to arid regions belt from New South Wales southwest to the South Australia-Western Australia border. The IUCN categorises it as Near Threatened. Conversely, the northern hairy-nosed wombat is categorised as Critically Endangered and only survives in a  range within the Epping Forest National Park in Queensland, but formerly also existed in Victoria and New South Wales.

Species
The genus includes the following species:

Fossils
 †Lasiorhinus angustidens (fossil)

References

Vombatiforms
Mammals of Western Australia
Mammals of South Australia
Mammals of New South Wales
Mammals of Queensland
Mammals of Victoria (Australia)
Marsupials of Australia
Marsupial genera
Taxa named by John Edward Gray